Ian Hussein Ngobi (born 11 April 2002) is a Dutch footballer who plays as a right-back for Eerste Klasse club Achilles '29.

Career
Born in Gennep, Limburg, Ngobi is the son of a Dutch mother and Ugandan father. He initially trained as a youngster with Vitesse '08 in his hometown before joining the VVV-Venlo academy.

He made his professional debut for VVV playing as a right back on 12 March 2022 against Helmond Sport in a 3–0 victory. He was credited with assisting Carl Johansson's goal. Ngobi made seven appearances for VVV during the 2021–22 season.

At the start of the 2022–23 season, he failed to make any appearances under new head coach Rick Kruys. In September 2022, Ngobi announced his retirement from professional football, to instead focus on finishing his education. On 14 October 2022, he joined amateur club Achilles '29, competing in the sixth-tier Eerste Klasse.

Career statistics

References

External links
 

Living people
2002 births
People from Gennep
Footballers from Limburg (Netherlands)
Dutch footballers
VVV-Venlo players
Achilles '29 players
Eerste Divisie players
Eerste Klasse players
Association football fullbacks
Dutch sportspeople of African descent